Ebba Amfeldt (21 December 1906 – 1 June 1974) was a Danish film actress. She appeared in 29 films between 1946 and 1973.

Filmography

 Mig og mafiaen (1973)
 På'en igen, Amalie (1973)
 Man sku være noget ved musikken (1972)
 Hovedjægerne (1971)
 Til lykke Hansen (1971)
 Olsen-banden (1968)
 Farvel Thomas (1968)
 Hold da helt ferie (1965)
 En ven i bolignøden (1965)
 Don Olsen kommer til byen (1964)
 Premiere i helvede (1964)
 Døden kommer til middag (1964)
 Støv for alle pengene (1963)
 Skyggen af en helt (1963)
 Vi har det jo dejligt (1963)
 Støvsugerbanden (1963)
 Der brænder en ild (1962)
 Drømmen om det hvide slot (1962)
 Det støver stadig (1962)
 Landsbylægen (1961)
 Eventyr på Mallorca (1961)
 Eventyrrejsen (1960)
 Frihedens pris (1960)
 Paw (1959)
 Over alle grænser (1958)
 Mod og mandshjerte (1955)
 Vores lille by (1954)
 Sukceskomponisten (1954)
 Jeg elsker en anden (1946)

References

External links

1906 births
1974 deaths
Danish film actresses
Actresses from Copenhagen
20th-century Danish actresses